Aad John Vinje (November 10, 1857 – March 23, 1929) was an American judge, and the 12th Chief Justice of the Wisconsin Supreme Court.

Background
Aad John Vinje was born on the Vinje farm (Winje nedre) in Vangen parish in Voss,  Hordaland, Norway. His father died from injuries received in an accident in 1859 and his mother subsequently remarried.  The family came to the United States in 1869 when Vinje was 12 years old.  His parents, Mons Knudsen Vinje (1831-1923) and Ingeborg Davidsdatter (Klove) Vinje (1824–1901), immigrated together with their five children. His family settled in Marshall County, Iowa, where Vinje attended Iowa College (now Grinnell College)  at Grinnell, Iowa from 1873 to 1874 and Northwestern University at Des Moines, Iowa from 1874 to 1875.

Career
Vinje earned his law degree from the University of Wisconsin Law School (B.A., 1884; LL.B., 1887). While in school, he worked in the State Law Library.  Vinje served as assistant Supreme Court reporter until 1891, when he established a law office in  Superior, Wisconsin. 
In 1895, Vinje was appointed judge for the 11th Wisconsin Judicial Circuit where he served until 1910. He won election to 10-year terms on the Supreme Court in 1911 and 1921. Upon the death of Chief Justice Robert G. Siebecker in February 1922, Vinje became the Chief Justice, a position he occupied until his death in 1929.

Selected works
The Legal Aspect of Industrial Consolidations (Feb. 16, 1904), in Reports of the Proceedings of the Meetings of the State Bar Ass’n of Wisconsin, 1904–05, at 167, 171 (1906).

Personal life
Vinje was married in 1886 to Alice Idell Miller (1863-1954). They were the parents of four children. Aad J. Vinje died during 1929 and was buried at the Forest Hill Cemetery in Dane County, Wisconsin.

References

1857 births
1929 deaths
People from Voss
Norwegian emigrants to the United States
Grinnell College alumni
University of Wisconsin Law School alumni
Wisconsin lawyers
Chief Justices of the Wisconsin Supreme Court
Politicians from Superior, Wisconsin
19th-century American lawyers